Luther Robinson (born February 24, 1991) is an American football defensive end who is currently a free agent. He played college football at the University of Miami and attended Fort Pierce Westwood High School in Fort Pierce, Florida. He has  been a member of the Green Bay Packers and San Diego Chargers.

Early years
Robinson played high school football for the Fort Pierce Westwood High School Panthers. He recorded 90 tackles, 14 sacks, one interception, 10 forced fumbles and three fumble recoveries his senior year, earning all-area first-team defense honors. Khalil Mack, Robinson's cousin, played football with him on the Panthers.

College career
Robinson played from 2010 to 2013 for the Miami Hurricanes. He was redshirted in 2009.

Professional career

Green Bay Packers
Robinson was signed by the Green Bay Packers on May 19, 2014 after going undrafted in the 2014 NFL Draft. He was released by the Packers on August 30, 2014. He was signed to the Packers' practice squad on September 1, 2014. Robinson was promoted to the active roster on October 2, 2014 and made his NFL debut the same day against the Minnesota Vikings. He was released by the Packers on May 11, 2015.

San Diego Chargers
Robinson signed with the San Diego Chargers on August 3, 2015. He was released by the Chargers on August 30, 2015.

Statistics
Source: NFL.com

References

External links
NFL Draft Scout

Living people
1991 births
Players of American football from Florida
American football defensive ends
African-American players of American football
Miami Hurricanes football players
Green Bay Packers players
People from Fort Pierce, Florida
21st-century African-American sportspeople